Devon Beitzel (born February 24, 1988) is an American former professional basketball point guard.  He played college basketball for Northern Colorado. As a redshirt senior in 2010–11, he averaged 21.5 points and 3.3 rebounds per game. Beitzel was named Big Sky Conference Men's Basketball Player of the Year and led the Bears to their first NCAA Tournament berth in school history.  Beitzel also received national recognition in 2011 as a first team Academic All-American, a Lowe's Senior CLASS Award finalist and an AP honorable mention All-American.

In November 2011, Beitzel signed with San Martín de Corrientes of Argentina's A League. Beitzel played on season of professional basketball in Argentina before returning to the United States to enter a career in business, joining Federated Insurance in Minnesota. Two years later, he became a sales executive for Flood & Peterson Insurance in Greeley, Colorado.

References

1988 births
Living people
American expatriate basketball people in Argentina
American men's basketball players
Club San Martín de Corrientes basketball players
Basketball players from Colorado
Northern Colorado Bears men's basketball players
People from Lafayette, Colorado
Point guards